Kuc may refer to:

People
 Alma Kuc (born 1998), Polish gymnast
 Armisa Kuč (born 1992), Montenegrin footballer
 Dariusz Kuć (born 1986), Polish sprint athlete
 Enes Küç (born 1996), German-Turkish footballer
 John Kuc (born 1947), American powerlifter
 Marina Kuč (born 1985), Montenegrin-German swimmer
 Samuel Kuc (born 1998), Slovak footballer
 Thomas Kuc (born 2002), American actor
 Wiesław Kuc (born 1949), Polish politician

Other
 Kuç (disambiguation), various settlements in Albania
 Kiribati Uniting Church
 Kwantlen Polytechnic University

See also